The Conservative Nationalist Party was a minor Australian political party that ran two candidates for the Australian House of Representatives in the 1983 federal election.

References

Defunct political parties in Australia
Political parties with year of establishment missing
Political parties with year of disestablishment missing